The title of Baron Welles has been created three times. Its first creation was for Adam de Welles on 6 May 1299 in the Peerage of England by writ of summons. This creation was extinguished by attainder in 1469. The title was created a second time in the Peerage of England by writ of summons for Sir Richard Hastings on 15 November 1482 and became extinct on his death. The third creation was on 8 January 1781, in the Peerage of Ireland, for Thomas Knox, later Viscount Northland. It is now a subsidiary title of the Earl of Ranfurly.

Barons Welles (1299)
Adam de Welles, 1st Baron Welles (d. 1311)
Robert de Welles, 2nd Baron Welles (1297–1320)
Adam de Welles, 3rd Baron Welles (1304–1345)
John de Welles, 4th Baron Welles (1334–1361)
John de Welles, 5th Baron Welles (1352–1421)
Lionel de Welles, 6th Baron Welles (1406–1461) (attainted 1461)
Richard de Welles, 7th Baron Welles (c. 1429–1469/1470) (attainder reversed 1468; attainted 1469/1470)
Robert de Welles, 8th Baron Welles (ex. 1470)

Barons Welles (1482)
Richard Hastings, Baron Welles (d. 1503), might have been deprived of title in 1486, due to reversal of attainders in 1485/86 parliament.

Viscount Welles (1487)
John Welles, 1st Viscount Welles (c. 1450–1499)

Barons Welles (1781)
Thomas Knox, 1st Baron Welles (1729–1818) (created Viscount Northland 1791)
For further Barons Welles, see Earl of Ranfurly.

References

 Adam de Welles (1st Baron) in Scotland (Yester Castle) and Alexander de Welles, Master of Torphichen Preceptory, Scottish Headquarters of the Knights Hospitaller of the Order of St John of Jerusalem.

1299 establishments in England
Extinct baronies in the Peerage of England
Baronies in the Peerage of Ireland
Forfeited baronies in the Peerage of England
Noble titles created in 1299
Noble titles created in 1482
Noble titles created in 1781